This is a list of schools in Negeri Sembilan, Malaysia. It is categorised according to the variants of schools in Malaysia, and is arranged alphabetically.

Chinese Independent High Schools
 Chung Hua High School Seremban (芙蓉中华中学)
 Chung Hua Middle School (波德申中华中学)

Islamic religious schools

Secondary education: Sekolah Menengah Agama (SMA)
 Sekolah Menengah Agama Dato' Klana Petra Maamor
 Maahad Ahmadi, Gemencheh (previously known as Sekolah Agama Menengah Atas Dan Senawi - abbreviated SAMAS)
 Sheikh Haji Mohd Said Religious Institution (SMK (A) Sheikh Haji Mohd Said - also abbreviated SMKA SHAMS)
 Sekolah Menengah Agama Persekutuan Labu
 SMKA Dato' Haji Abu Hassan Haji Sail (SMKA Pedas), Rembau
 SMA Nilai, Nilai
 Sekolah Menengah Agama Teluk Kemang
 Sekolah Menenngah Agama Sains Kuala Pilah
 Institut Tahfiz Al-Quran Negeri Sembilan

National schools

Primary education: Sekolah Kebangsaan (SK)
 SK Chembong
 SK Datuk Akhir Zaman, Rantau
 SK Jalan Tokong Setia
 SK Batang Benar, Mantin
 SK Desa Cempaka, Nilai
 SK Kota
 SK King George V
 SK Seri Kelana, Seremban
 SK Kuala Klawang
 SK Mantin
 SK Methodist (ACS)
 SK Nyatoh
 SK Panglima Adnan, Port Dickson
 SK Port Dickson
 SK Sungala
 SK Si Rusa
 SK Puteri
 SK Taman Tuanku Jaafar, Sg.Gadut
 SK Senawang
 SK Seri Pagi
 SK Taman Dusun Nyior
 SK Taman Tasik Jaya
 SK Taman Bandar Senawang
 SK Telok Kemang, Port dickson
 SK Sikamat
 SK Pilin
 Sekolah Kebangsaan Rahang, Seremban
 SK Seremban 2A
 SK Seremban 2B
 SK Wawasan
 SK Taman Rasah Jaya
 SK Kuala Pilah
 SK Dato' Bandar Rasah
 SK Desa Cempaka, Nilai
 SK Dato Idris
 SK Ampang Tinggi
 SK Talang, Tg Ipoh
 SK Undang Rembau, Rembau
 SK Men Sri Perpatih (Felda)
 SK Tunku Kurshiah
 SK Pasoh 2 (F)
 SK Seberang Batu Hampar, Rembau
 SK Seremban Jaya 1, Seremban
 SK Sungai Dua, Gemencheh
 SK Labu Ulu, Batu 8
 SK Desa Jasmin, Nilai
 SK Labu, Batu 10.
 SK Dato' Shahbandar Abu Bakar, Labu Hilir
 SK Dr. Sulaiman, Tampin
 SK Tunku Besar/Tunku Besar School, Tampin
 SK Tengku Zainun, Tampin (Previously SK Tampin)
 SK Taman Semarak, Nilai
 SK Taman Paroi Jaya
 SK PULAPAH/SEKOLAH KLUSTER KECERMELANGAN PULAPOL AIR HITAM

Secondary education: Sekolah Menengah Kebangsaan (SMK)

National type schools
A) Primary Schools
a. Tamil Schools: "Sekolah Jenis Kebangsaan Tamil (SJKT)
 Convent, Seremban 2
 Lorong Jawa, 70100 Seremban
 Jalan Lobak, 70200 Seremban.
 Nilai,71800 Nilai
 Ladang Batang Benar,71800 Nilai
 Ladang Kirby, 71900 Labu
 Ladang Kubang, 71800 Nilai
 Jindaram, 71800 Nilai
 Cairo, 71700 Mantin
 Ladang Labu Bhg. 1,71900 Labu
 Ladang Labu Bhg.4, 71900 Labu
 Ladang Senawang.71450 Seremban
 Ladang Seremban, 71450 Seremban
 Perhentian Tinggi,71450 Sg. Gadut
 Ladang Kombok, 71200 Rantau
 Rantau,71200 Rantau
 Ladang Shanghai,70300 Seremban
 Tun Sambanthan, Pajam,71700 Mantin
 Ladang Lenggeng, 71750 Lenggeng
 Port Dickson,71000 Port dickson
 Ladang St. Leonards,71000 P.Dickson
 Ladang Sendayan, 71100 Siliau
 Kem Askar Diraja Melayu, 71050 Si Rusa
 Ladang Sengkang, 71250 Pasir Panjang
 Ladang Sungala, 71050 Si Rusa
 Ldg. Sua Betong,71000 Port Dickson
 Ldg. Tanah Merah,71000 Port Dickson
 Ldg. Atherton,71100 Siliau
 Ladang Bradwal,71100 Siliau
 Ladang Jemima,71100 Siliau
 Ladang Sungai Salak,71100 Siliau
 Ladang Saga,71100 Siliau
 Ladang Siliau,71100 Siliau
 Ladang Lin Sum,71200 Rantau
 Ladang Tampin Linggi, 71100 Siliau
 Mukundan, Bukit Pelandok,71960 Seremban
 Kuala Pilah,72000 Kuala Pilah
 Ladang Juasseh,72000 Kuala Pilah
 Ladang Bahau,72100 Bahau
 Ladang Air Hitam,72100 Bahau
 Ladang Geddes,72100 Bahau
 Ladang Sungai Sebaling,72100 Bahau
 Ladang Kelpin,72100 Bahau
 Ladang Senama,72100 Bahau
 Ladang St. Helier,72100 Bahau
 Ladang Sialang,72100 Bahau
 Ladang Jeram Padang,72100 Bahau
 Ladang Tanah Panjis,73500 Rompin
 Ladang Middleton,73500 Rompin
 Ladang Pertang,72300 Sg. Pertang
 Tampin,73000 Tampin
 Ladang Repah,73000 Tampin
 Ladang Regent,73200 Gemenceh
 Air Kuning Selatan,73200 Gemenceh
 Ladang Bukit Keledek,77100 Jasin
 Gemas,73400 Gemas
 Ladang Sungai Gelama,73400 Gemas
 Ladang Batu Hampar,71300 Rembau
 Ladang Chembong,71300 Rembau
 Ladang Sungai Bharu,71150 Linggi

Chinese Type Primary and Secondary School

Chinese Primary School
 SJK (C) AIR KUNING SELATAN
 SJK (C) BAHAU
 SJK (C) CHAN WA 
 SJK (C) CHI CHI
 SJK (C) CHI HWA
 SJK (C) CHI SIN
 SJK (C) CHI WEN
 SJK (C) CHUAH	
 SJK (C) CHUN YIN 
 SJK (C) CHUNG HUA
 SJK (C) CHUNG HUA KUALA PILAH
 SJK (C) CHUNG HUA RANTAU
 SJK (C) CHUNG HUA SENALING
 SJK (C) CHUNG HUA TAMPIN
 SJK (C) CHUNG HUA TG. IPOH
 SJK (C) CHUNG PIN
 SJK (C) CHUNG SAN
 SJK (C) KG. BARU BATU 8
 SJK (C) KG. BARU BK GELUGOR
 SJK (C) KG. BARU BROGA
 SJK (C) KG. BARU DURIAN TIPUS
 SJK (C) KG. BARU GEDOK
 SJK (C) KG. BARU GEMAS
 SJK (C) KG. BARU KEPIS
 SJK (C) KG. BARU MAHSAN
 SJK (C) KG. BARU MAMBAU
 SJK (C) KG. BARU PAJAM
 SJK (C) KG. BARU PANTAI
 SJK (C) KG. BARU PARIT TINGGI
 SJK (C) KG. BARU PAROI
 SJK (C) KG. BARU PERTANG
 SJK (C) KG. BARU PETALING
 SJK (C) KG. BARU RAHANG
 SJK (C) KG. BARU SG. NIPAH
 SJK (C) KG. BARU SIKAMAT
 SJK (C) KG. BARU TAMPIN
 SJK (C) KG. BARU TANAH MERAH (A)
 SJK (C) KG. SG. MUNTOH
 SJK (C) KUO MIN
 SJK (C) KUO MIN
 SJK (C) KUO MIN
 SJK (C) LDG BRADWALL
 SJK (C) LDG GLENDALE
 SJK (C) LDG HILLSIDE
 SJK (C) LDG KELPIN
 SJK (C) LDG MIDDLETON
 SJK (C) LDG REGENT
 SJK (C) LDG SENDAYAN
 SJK (C) LDG SILIAU
 SJK (C) LDG SUA BETONG
 SJK (C) LDG ULU KANCHONG
 SJK (C) MA HWA
 SJK (C) MIN SHING
 SJK (C) PEI CHUN
 SJK (C) PEI HUA
 SJK (C) PEI HWA PEDAS
 SJK (C) PEI TECK KOTA
 SJK (C) SAN MIN
 SJK (C) SG. SALAK
 SJK (C) SIN HUA
 SJK (C) SIN MIN
 SJK (C) SIN MIN
 SJK (C) SINO-ENGLISH
 SJK (C) SPG PERTANG
 SJK (C) ST. LEONARDS
 SJK (C) TANAH MERAH SITE (C) 
 SJK (C) TUNG HU
 SJK (C) YIK CHIAO
 SJK (C) YIK HWA
 SJK (C) YOKE HUA AIR MAWANG
 SJK (C) YU CHAI
 SJK (C) YUK CHAI
 SJK (C) YUK HUA
 SJK (C) YUK HUA
 SJK (C) YUK HUA REMBAU

Technical secondary schools: Sekolah Menengah Teknik (SMT)

 SMT Ampangan, Seremban
 SMT Dato' Undang Haji Muhamad Sharip, Rembau
 SMT Dato'Lela Maharaja, Rembau
 SMV Juasseh, Juasseh
 SMT Kuala Klawang, Jelebu
 SMT Port Dickson, Port Dickson
 SMT Tuanku Jaafar, Seremban (STTJ)

Boarding schools
Fully residential schools (SBP)
 Kolej Tunku Kurshiah (TKC)
 Sekolah Datuk Abdul Razak (SDAR)
 Sekolah Menengah Sains Tuanku Munawir (SASER)
 Sekolah Menengah Agama Persekutuan Labu (SMAPL)
 Sekolah Menengah Sains Rembau (SEMESRA)
 Sekolah Menengah Sains Tuanku Jaafar (STJ)
 Sekolah Berasrama Penuh Intergrasi Jempol (SBPIJ)
 Sekolah Menengah Sains Tuanku Aishah Rohani (SGS)

International schools
Epsom College in Malaysia
 Nilai International School
 Kolej Tuanku Ja'afar
Zenith International School
Matrix Global School 
UCSI International School Bandar Springhill

Others
 Kolej Mara Seremban jas
 Maktab Rendah Sains MARA Kuala Klawang
 Maktab Rendah Sains MARA Serting
 Maktab Rendah Sains MARA Gemencheh
 Sekolah Agama Ar-Raudhah

See also
 Education in Malaysia

References

Negeri Sembilan